I was Dead for 7 Weeks in the City of Angels is the fourth album of the Spanish rock band Dover, released on 17 September 2001. It sold 200,000 copies. The name of the album comes from a series of irregularities that the group had in its recording stage, as Cristina was sick for several weeks and there were a number of problems with producer Barrett Jones.

Track listing 
Lyrics and music by Amparo Llanos and Cristina Llanos.

Appearances 
"Love Is a Bitch" is heard in the 2000 film Amores Perros.

"King George" is included on the soundtrack of the music video game Rock Band 3.

Personnel 
Dover
 Cristina Llanos – vocals, acoustic guitar
 Amparo Llanos – guitar
 Álvaro Díez – bass guitar
 Jesús Antúnez – drums

Charts

Chart positions

Release history

Certifications

References

External links 
 

Dover (band) albums
2001 albums
Chrysalis Records albums